Geoff Mudge (born 30 September 1935) is a former international speedway rider from Australia.

Speedway career 
Mudge won a silver medal during the Speedway World Pairs Championship in the 1968 Speedway World Pairs Championship. The medal was won under a Great Britain vest when Oceania riders were allowed to represent Britain.

He rode in the top tier of British Speedway from 1965-1976, riding for various clubs.

World Final appearances

World Pairs Championship
 1968 -  Kempten* (with Ray Wilson) - 2nd - 21pts
* Unofficial World Championships. Rode for Great Britain

References 

1935 births
Living people
Australian speedway riders
Exeter Falcons riders
Newport Wasps riders
Poole Pirates riders
Reading Racers riders
Southampton Saints riders
Sportspeople from Adelaide